Cranes Branch is a tributary of Brown Creek in Anson County, North Carolina that rises north of Polkton, North Carolina and then flows east to meet Brown Creek about 3 miles northeast of Polkton. The watershed is about 58% forested, 36% agricultural and the rest is of other land uses.

See also
List of North Carolina rivers

References

Rivers of North Carolina
Rivers of Anson County, North Carolina
Tributaries of the Pee Dee River